Marx Freud Santos Ferraz (born 9 May 1988) is a Brazilian football player who currently plays for Caldense as a defender.

External links
 

1988 births
Living people
Brazilian footballers
Sociedade Esportiva Palmeiras players
SønderjyskE Fodbold players
Vila Nova Futebol Clube players
Ituano FC players
América Futebol Clube (RN) players
Boa Esporte Clube players
Futebol Clube Santa Cruz players
Esporte Clube Rio Verde players
Associação Atlética Caldense players
Association football defenders
Sportspeople from Goiânia